Amphixystis hapsimacha is a species of moth in the family Tineidae first described by Edward Meyrick in 1901. It is endemic to New Zealand.

References

Hieroxestinae
Moths described in 1901
Moths of New Zealand
Endemic fauna of New Zealand
Taxa named by Edward Meyrick
Endemic moths of New Zealand